The 1974 Monaco Grand Prix was a Formula One motor race held at Monaco on 26 May 1974. It was race 6 of 15 in both the 1974 World Championship of Drivers and the 1974 International Cup for Formula One Manufacturers. The 78-lap race was won by Lotus driver Ronnie Peterson after he started from third position. Jody Scheckter finished second for the Tyrrell team and Shadow driver Jean-Pierre Jarier came in third.

Qualifying

Qualifying classification

Race

Classification

Championship standings after the race

Drivers' Championship standings

Constructors' Championship standings

Note: Only the top five positions are included for both sets of standings.

References

Monaco Grand Prix
Monaco Grand Prix
Grand Prix